Neopera is a German band which combines symphonic metal music with light electronic music, operatic (male/female) vocals and death growls. The band was formed in 2011 in Hamburg.

History 
Jörn Schubert (Dark Age) always wanted to combine heavy metal music with classical music. For this purpose, he sought suitable musicians, eventually finding the soprano Nina Jiers and the baritone Thorsten Schuck. At that time, Jiers had no experience with metal. Mirko Gluschke (Dead End Circle), who is a good friend of Schubert, became the growling vocalist. Dirk Schlächter (Gamma Ray) became the band's bass guitarist. In addition, during the recording of the demo, Corvin Bahn (ex-(?)Gamma Ray), André Schumann (Dark Age) and Guiomar Espineira (flautist) helped, in order to release the first demo ("Destined Ways'") in mid-2011, in collaboration with the producer Elke Freese (Dark Age, Hammer Studios).

On 29 May 2012, Schubert signed a contract with the record company earMUSIC which asked him to record an entire album. The recordings for the album Destined Ways began in June 2012 and were finished in November 2012. It was released in Germany on 29 August 2014 and internationally on 18 July 2014.  The two-year time gap between the completion of the album and its release was explained by the search for a suitable sample space and new members. Schumann and Espineira were only intended for the studio recordings, and Bahn was not available at that time for live performances. Therefore, the band searched for new live musicians. Eventually, Mikis Trimborn (Syndemic) became the second guitarist, while Thorsten Harnitz (Counter-World Experience, Crystal Breed) became the drummer.

On 1 August 2014, Neopera made their second appearance at Wacken Open Air.

This was followed by a long break for health reasons.

In 2020, the band released the EP In Memoriam (which was produced back in 2015). Their new single "An Eternal Night" marked their comeback.

During the recording of "Destined Ways", Schubert fell ill with muscular dystonia in his left hand and from then on could only make music to a very limited extent. He took the title of the debut album "Destined Ways" literally and tackled the path that had been predetermined for him with a firm step. After years of therapy, the path with Neopera continues. Schubert will no longer be seen on stage. As a composer, however, he is more active than ever.

He follows the predetermined path together with Schuck, who has accompanied him since the beginning of Neopera, and a complete new line-up: Jasmin Gajewski (soprano singer), Nino Helfrich (guitarist), and Denis Filimonov (bassist and growler).

"Neopera combines metal with elements of classical music. Dominant guitars, shouts and driving rhythms combine with classical singing and orchestral arrangements. Everything, of course, in harmony with the texts, which immerse the listener in various stories. - Jörn Schubert"

Discography 
Studio albums
2014: Destined Ways

Singles and EPs
2013: The Marvel of Chimera
2020: In Memoriam 
2021: An Eternal Night
2021: Verge of War

Music videos
2013: "The Marvel of Chimera"
2014: "Destined Ways"
2014: "Error"
2021: "An Eternal Night"
2021: "Verge of War"
2022: "Tuba Mirum"
2022: "Side by Side"
2022: "A New God"

Line-up 
Current members
Jasmin Gajewski — soprano vocals
Thorsten Schuck — baritone vocals
Nino Helfrich — guitars
Denis Filimonov — growled vocals and bass guitar
Jörn Schubert (Dark Age, ex-Holy Moses) — composer and founder

Previous members
Dirk Schlächter — bass guitar
Mirko Gluschke — growled vocals
Nina Jiers — soprano vocals
Thorsten Harnitz (Counter-World Experience, Crystal Breed) — drums
Ole Buuck — drums
Tom Lutschke — guitars

Guest/session members
André Schumann (ex-Stormwarrior, Dark Age) — drums
Corvin Bahn (ex-(?)Gamma Ray, Jane) — keyboards, orchestrations
Guiomar Espineira — western concert flute
Mikis Trimborn (Syndemic) — guitars

References

External links 

Neopera.com Official website

https://www.metalreviews.com/reviews/album/8825
https://www.amazon.com/Destined-Ways-Neopera/product-reviews/B01K8NI2T4?reviewerType=all_reviews

German symphonic metal musical groups
Musical groups established in 2010
2010 establishments in Germany